Sir Sarat Kumar Ghosh or Ghose, ICS  (3 July 1879 – 8 January 1963) was an Indian civil servant and a jurist.

Background and education
He was the son of Rai Bahadur Tarini Kumar Ghosh, Inspector General of Registration of the Government of Bengal. He was a student of Mitra Institution, Calcutta and Presidency College, Calcutta, where he earned first-class honours. He was married to Niraj Nalini Ghosh (née De), the third daughter of Brajendranath De, the 8th Indian member of the Indian Civil Service. After his marriage he went to Trinity College, Cambridge where he successfully took the Open Competitive Service Examination, joining the judicial wing of the service. He joined the ICS in 1903. He was also called to the Bar by The Honourable Society of the Inner Temple.

Career
He was the Additional Judge of Chittagong, District Judge of Comilla and then the District Judge of Hooghly in 1929. Later, he appointed as a Puisne Judge of the Calcutta High Court. He was conferred a knighthood in 1938. He became the Chief Justice of the Indian Princely State of Jaipur and then the last Chief Justice of the Indian Princely State of  Kashmir from 29 March 1946 to 29 March 1948. He was one of the last officials of the former regime in Kashmir to have left the state just before the first Indo-Pakistan war broke out in 1948. At the time of India's independence he became the Interim Chief Justice of the High Court of Rajasthan. He was also Chairman of the Rajasthan Public Service Commission.

Later life
After returning from Rajasthan, the Government of West Bengal appointed him as Judge of a one-man Tribunal to deal with cases involving communist insurgents in the state.

Through the 1950s he was a Steward of the Royal Calcutta Turf Club, a position he retained until the end of his life.

References

External links
Official Website of Royal Calcutta Turf Club

1879 births
1963 deaths
Bengali Hindus
20th-century Bengalis
19th-century Bengalis
Bengali lawyers
Administrators in the princely states of India
Presidency University, Kolkata alumni
University of Calcutta alumni
Alumni of Trinity College, Cambridge
Indian barristers
Indian civil servants
Indian Civil Service (British India) officers
Indian judges
20th-century Indian judges
Knights Bachelor
Indian Knights Bachelor
People from Hooghly district
Chief Justices of the Rajasthan High Court
Chief Justices of the Jammu and Kashmir High Court
Indian lawyers
19th-century Indian lawyers
20th-century Indian lawyers
Indian jurists
20th-century Indian jurists